Omphalea triandra, also known as Jamaican cobnut and pop nut is a plant species endemic to Jamaica and Haiti.

Larvae of certain species of moths of the genus Urania feed on the leaves of Omphalea triandra.

References

External links

triandra
Flora of Jamaica
Flora without expected TNC conservation status